New Look may refer to:
New Look (style of clothing), a line of clothing by Christian Dior
New Look (company), a clothing retailer based in the United Kingdom
New Look (policy), a United States foreign policy at the start of the Cold War
GM New Look bus, a city bus made by General Motors from 1959 to 1986
New Look (band), a Canadian electronic music duo
New Look (album)
New Look (TV series), a 1958-1959 British television show
New Look!, a 1967 album by George Shearing
"New Look psychology", a theoretical approach in psychology, initiated by Jerome Bruner
"New Look", song by Namie Amuro
"New Look", song by Rita Ora
NewLook (magazine), a magazine published by Bob Guccioni's Penthouse International, from May 1985 to September 1986